Bidrubeh Pumping Stations ( – Tolombeh Khāneh Bīdrūbeh) is a village in Hoseyniyeh Rural District, Alvar-e Garmsiri District, Andimeshk County, Khuzestan Province, Iran. At the 2006 census, its population was 99, in 18 families.

References 

Populated places in Andimeshk County